This is a list of notable hard rock musicians.

0–9

3 Doors Down

A

AC/DC
Aerosmith
Ahat
Airbourne
Alcatrazz
Alice Cooper (the band)
Alice in Chains
Alisa
Alkatrazz
Amajlija
The Amboy Dukes
The Angels
The Answer
April Wine
Argent
Asterix
Atomic Opera
Atomic Rooster
Attila
Avenged Sevenfold

B

Babe Ruth
Baby Animals
Sebastian Bach
Randy Bachman
Bachman–Turner Overdrive
Bad Company
Badlands
Bakery
Balkan
Band-Maid
Barnabas
Jimmy Barnes
BB Steal
Beatrice
Pat Benatar
Nuno Bettencourt
Betty Blowtorch
Birth Control
Birtha
Kat Bjelland
Black 'n Blue
Black Oak Arkansas
Black Widow
Blackfeather
Blackfoot
Blackjack
Ritchie Blackmore
Bloodrock
Blue Cheer
Blue Öyster Cult
Blues Creation
Blues Image
Tim Bogert
Michael Bolton 
Bon Jovi
Graham Bonnet 
Boston
Bow Wow
Boys
Brainbox
Breaking Benjamin
Bring Me the Horizon
Brownsville Station
Jack Bruce
Buckcherry
Buffalo
Cidny Bullens
Buster Brown
BUX
Glen Buxton
B'z

C

Cactus
Cheap Trick
Cheetah
Chevelle
The Choirboys
Chrome
Cinderella
Circus of Power
Cirith Ungol 
Eric Clapton
Cold
Coldrain
Cold Chisel
Alice Cooper (the musician)
Copperhead
Coven
Crack the Sky
Cream
Peter Criss
István Cserháti
The Cult

D

D-A-D
Roger Daltrey
Daniel Band
Deep Purple
Def Leppard
Defryme
Rick Derringer
Detroit
Divlje jagode
Dokken
The Doors
Doro
Dream Theater
Drowning Pool
Duke Jupiter

E

Eagles of Death Metal
Eloy
John Entwistle
Enuff Z'Nuff
Europe
Extreme

F

Fanny
Finch
The Firm
Five Finger Death Punch
Floating Me
Flower Travellin' Band
Foghat
Lita Ford
Foreigner
The Four Horsemen
Free
Frijid Pink
Fuse

G

Gamma
Geeza
Geordie
Ghost
Gillan
Girlschool
Glass Harp
Godsmack
Golden Earring
Grand Funk Railroad
Great White
Derry Grehan
Jack Green
Greta Van Fleet
The Guess Who
Guns N' Roses

H

Sammy Hagar
Hanoi Rocks
Hard Stuff
Lauren Harris
Hawkwind
Haywire
Head East
Headpins
Heart
Heavy Metal Kids
Jimi Hendrix / The Jimi Hendrix Experience
His Majesty
Honeymoon Suite
House of Lords
Humble Pie
Ian Hunter
Steve Hunter

I

In This Moment
Iron Butterfly

J

Mick Jagger
James Gang
Jefferson Starship
Jeronimo
Jerusalem
Jethro Tull
Jo Jo Gunne
John Paul Jones
Journey
Juicy Lucy
Jutro

K

Kahvas Jute
Karthago
Kin Ping Meh
King's X
The Kinks
Kiss
Kracker
Krokus

L

L.A. Guns
Allen Lanier
The Law
Leather Charm
Led Zeppelin
Kerry Livgren
Living Colour
Nils Lofgren
Loverboy
Lucifer's Friend
George Lynch
Phil Lynott
Lynyrd Skynyrd
Jimmy Lyon

M

Madder Lake
Majke
Manic Street Preachers
Marilyn Manson
Mantissa
Frank Marino
Steve Marriott
Bernie Marsden
Masters of Reality
MC5
Klaus Meine
Metallica
Charlie Midnight
Montrose
Ronnie Montrose
Keith Moon
Mötley Crüe
Motörhead
Mountain
Moxy
Mr. Big
Mudvayne
My Chemical Romance

See also
List of hard rock musicians (N–Z)

References

Bibliography

Hard Rock 01